Breakheart may refer to:

 Breakheart Pass (novel), written by Alistair MacLean
 Breakheart Pass (film), 1975 film starring Charles Bronson and Ben Johnson
 Breakheart Reservation, a Massachusetts state park